Geir Luedy (full name Geir Steen-Olsen Luedy, previous name 1990s Geir Luedy Andersen, born 7 August 1968 in Karlstad) is a Norwegian manager, musician (vocals, guitar, bass, piano, percussion), songwriter, and music producer.

Biography 

Geir Luedy began his career in production in 1998 as tape-boy for SIGMA studios in Bergen. He founded together with Even Johannsen the band Chocolate Overdose (singer-writer) in 1991 whereupon they released four albums over a period between 1992–1998. In 1998 he co-founded Lydriket Studio in Bergen and later co-founded the production company Your Favorite Music in 2003 together with Hans Petter Aaserud.

In 2012 he brought both companies into MADE Management and is now manager for artists such as AURORA, Sigrid and others.

He is the son of Knut Albrigt Andersen, and brother of the musicians guitarist "Tino" Knut Luedy Andersen and singer-songwriter "Doddo" Eduardo Hans Andersen. Luedy has performed with a series of artists, most of them based in Bergen.

Discography 
 With Monalisa Overdrive
 1988: Shake Me Hip (Tanzmusik Für Die Massen)

 With Forbidden Colours
 1989: Words to the World & Songs for the Girl  (Colour Records)
	
 With Barbie Bones
 1990: Brake For Nobody (EMI)
 1992: Death in the Rocking Horse Factory (EMI)

 With Chocolate Overdose
 1992: Everybody Likes Chocolate (WEA – 4509-90787-2)
 1993: Sugar Baby (WEA – 4509-93426-2)
 1998: Whatever (Rune Grammofon – RCD 2003)

 With Submarine Sunflowers
 1992: Submarine Sunflowers (Rec90)	
		
 With DumDum Boys
 1992: Transit (Oh Yeah!), on "God På Bunn"

 With Kivi
 1994: Den Dag Kjem Aldri (Tylden & Co – GTACD 8016)

 With Unge Frustrerte Menn
 1995: Doddo Og Unge Frustrerte Menn (Tylden & Co)
 1997: Hodet I Sanden (Grappa)
 2001: Dronningen Av Kalde Føtter (Grappa – GRCD 4135)

 With Kåre Kalvenes (K.K.)
 1995: Strings Attached (Splean Music – SM-106)

 With The Tubs
 1995: Pow Pow Pilots (Rec90 – RID 016)

 With Logikal
 1999: Maniacs Panics And Crashes (Supernova – SNCD 6002)

 With Aftenlandet
 2000: God Morgon Høst (Bergen Records – BRCD 1005)

 With Millpond Moon
 2001: Nation of Two (Bergen Records – BRCD 1007)

 With Steady Steele and the Starseekers
 2002: Steady Steele and the Starseekers (Soundlet	Soundlet – CD 001)

 With Tre Vise Menn
 2002: ...I Ein Tynne Tråd (Grappa – GRCD 4191)
	
 With Karin Park
 2003: Superworldunknown (Waterfall Records, Universal)
 2006: Change Your Mind (Superworldmusic – N 50025-2)

 With Kenneth Sivertsen
 2004: Fløyel (Noble Records – NOBCD 041), on "Fløyel"
	
 With Robert Post
 2005: Robert Post (Mercury – 9873483), on "Got None"
	
 With Jan Eggum
 2005: 30/30 (Grappa – GRCD 4230)
	
 With Susanne Sundfør
 2007: Susanne Sundfør (Your Favourite Music, MBN – N 50048-2)
	
 With The Alexandria Quartet
 2007: The Alexandria Quartet (Your Favourite Music)

 With Heine Totland
 2009: The Sunny Side (Your Favourite Music – YFM20092), on "All Dressed Up With Nowhere to Go"

 With Wenche Gausdal
 2012: Alegria (Losen Records – LOS 116–2)

Singles 
 With Kenneth Sivertsen
 2000: Var Ikkje Der / Traff Deg Så Tidleg (Edel – EREP 107386)

 With Paris
 2002: Without You (Columbia)
	
 With Tennis
 2002: Here Comes The Coastguard / Enter The Dragon (Flow-Fi Records – flow-fi 04.02)

 With Glenn Kristian Olstad (Glenn)
 2004: Thanks For Leaving (Waterfall Records – WTRS003)

 With Trang Fødsel
 2005: Fredag (Sony BMG Music Entertainment – PROMO CD 1)

References

External links 
 

Norwegian male singers
Norwegian singer-songwriters
Norwegian multi-instrumentalists
Norwegian record producers
Norwegian composers
Norwegian male composers
1968 births
Living people
Musicians from Bergen